Francesco Gattilusio may refer to:

 Francesco I Gattilusio (died 1384) Lord of Lesbos
 Francesco II Gattilusio (1365–1404) Lord of Lesbos
 Francesco III Gattilusio (15th century), Lord of Thasos

See also

 Gattilusi (family)
 Francesco (name)